Hapon is a Polish and Ukrainian surname that may refer to:
 Volodymyr Hapon (born 1979), Ukrainian footballer
 Yevhen Hapon, Ukrainian far-right musician

See also
 Gapon (disambiguation)

Ukrainian-language surnames